James A. Parsons (ca. 1868 in Steuben County, New York – March 4, 1945 in Albany, New York) was an American lawyer and politician.

Life
He was admitted to the bar of Nebraska in 1890, and moved back to New York in 1893. He then lived in Hornell, New York where he was at times City Attorney and City Recorder.

In 1911, he was appointed Fourth Deputy Attorney General by Thomas Carmody, and his first task was to resume the Queens graft prosecutions, relieving Arthur Train who had been the Special Deputy Attorney General in charge of the case, appointed by Carmody's predecessor Edward R. O'Malley. Upon Carmody's resignation on September 2, 1914, Parsons was appointed New York State Attorney General by Governor Martin H. Glynn for the remaining four months of Carmody's term. He ran for re-election in November 1914, but was defeated by Republican Egburt E. Woodbury.

He was an alternate delegate to the 1912 Democratic National Convention, and a delegate to the 1920 Democratic National Convention.

He was counsel to Governor Al Smith who appointed him in 1923 New York State Public Service Commissioner, and in 1924 a judge of the New York Court of Claims a post he held until 1936 when he resigned.

Sources
 Political Graveyard
 List of New York Attorneys General, at Office of the NYSAG
 The Queens prosecution, in NYT on January 12, 1911
 His appointment as NYSAG, in NYT on September 3, 1914

1860s births
1945 deaths
New York State Attorneys General
People from Hornell, New York
New York (state) state court judges